Otto the Mild (24 June 1292 – 30 August 1344), Duke of Brunswick-Lüneburg, ruled over the Brunswick part of the duchy.

Otto was the eldest son of Albert II, Duke of Brunswick-Lüneburg. Otto and his brothers succeeded on their father's death in 1318; he served as his brothers' guardian while they were not of age. In 1323, he acquired the Altmark from Brandenburg as an inheritance of his wife's; but he sold it in 1343, when he failed to establish control there.

Otto died in 1344 in Göttingen and was succeeded by his brothers.

Family

Firstly, Otto married Jutta (died 1317), daughter of Henry I, Landgrave of Hesse. Secondly, he married Agnes (1297–1334), daughter of Herman, Margrave of Brandenburg-Salzwedel, in 1319. From the first marriage, he had one daughter: Agnes (died 1371).

References
 Braunschweigisches Biographisches Lexikon, Appelhans 2006, 

1292 births
1344 deaths
Dukes of Brunswick-Lüneburg
Old House of Brunswick
Burials at Brunswick Cathedral